The 1974 Belgian Grand Prix was a Formula One motor race held at Nivelles on 12 May 1974. It was race 5 of 15 in both the 1974 World Championship of Drivers and the 1974 International Cup for Formula One Manufacturers. The 85-lap race was won by Brazilian driver Emerson Fittipaldi, driving a McLaren-Ford, with Austrian Niki Lauda a close second in a Ferrari and South African Jody Scheckter third in a Tyrrell-Ford. This race also marked the debut of Tom Pryce, making his first start for the newly formed Token team.

This was the second and last Belgian Grand Prix to be held at Nivelles. For most of the next decade, the race would be held at Zolder.

Qualifying

Qualifying classification

Race 

Clay Regazzoni got off to an instant lead from pole position. Emerson Fittipaldi was the closest anyone came to Regazzoni, having used the "clean" side of the grid to his advantage, leaving Jody Scheckter to fend off Niki Lauda for third. The rest came into turn 1 together.

The rest of the opening lap was uneventful, with the field quickly settling down. Regazzoni had established a small lead over Fittipaldi, who was left to fend off Scheckter and Lauda, with Ronnie Peterson and James Hunt close behind. Carlos Pace came next with Patrick Depailler, Jean-Pierre Beltoise and Mike Hailwood, while Hans-Joachim Stuck rounded out the field after a terrible start.

The following laps saw three groups form, each seemingly in their own race for the rest of afternoon. The fight for the lead featured the entire top six, who were running around Nivelles-Baulers nose-to-tail behind Regazzoni. The next group was headed by Pace, with his quintet of Depailler, Beltoise, Hailwood and Carlos Reutemann dropping away from sixth placed Hunt, but moving clear of Henri Pescarolo. Pescarolo was providing a bottle neck for the rest of the field, allowing both Jacky Ickx and Stuck to quickly climb up the order.

Unfortunately, the nature of the Nivelles-Baulers meant that overtaking was difficult, and Stuck dropped out of the race with a clutch issue. Ickx entered an intense duel with Arturo Merzario after both barged past Pescarolo. Pescarolo was left to fend off the rest of the field, only to be elbowed into the barriers by Guy Edwards, while Pace suffered a puncture and hence fell to the back of the pack.

Out front the top six remained glued together, unable to make a move on one another as they were all equally matched down the start/finish straight. The leaders came up to lap the backmarkers on lap 25.

Then, the top six came to lap François Migault, who was limping along in the outdated BRM, a few seconds behind Tim Schenken in the new Trojan. Regazzoni and Fittipaldi blasted past the Migault unhindered, before the group came into the braking zone for turn one. Lauda was next in line to take the BRM, but a slight hesitation from Lauda dropped him off the back of Fittipaldi. Once clear of Migault it quickly became clear that Lauda lacked the pace to keep with the leading duo without a tow, and so he tactfully allowed Scheckter past to claim his tow and drag himself back into contention.

Scheckter's strong pace did the trick, and its only took half a lap for the group to reform, aided by the fact that Regazzoni and Fittipaldi were about to lap a slower group of cars just ahead. This time, however, it would be Scheckter who got baulked, and by the time he and Lauda cleared the bunch, Regazzoni and Fittipaldi were four seconds clear. Scheckter and Lauda were therefore left to fight over third, while Peterson and Hunt dropped back after their own issues trying to make their way through the pack.

With the top six now split, it seemed as if the race would be a straight fight between Regazzoni and Fittipaldi for the rest of the afternoon, with the pair equally matched and without the distraction of Scheckter and co. Yet, there was to be one more twist as the pair scythed through the traffic which ultimately destroyed hopes of a fight for the lead. The victim would be Regazzoni, who misjudged a move on the recovering Pace and ran onto the grass, allowing Fittipaldi to charge through into the lead.

The Regazzoni ultimately rejoined behind teammate Lauda, who had pounced on Scheckter just a few corners earlier when the latter got baulked. As all of this was going on, Peterson slipped into the pits to have his front tyres changed, while Hunt had caught up to the back of the shackled Tyrrell after Scheckter's hesitation. Fittipaldi, meanwhile, was left with a one-second lead over Lauda and Regazzoni, with Lauda unable to really attack Fittipaldi.

Elsewhere, various mechanical issues had left Depailler on his own, now running in sixth, while Hailwood had escaped the pack to run in seventh, and was hunting down the Depailler. The Ickx/Merzario fight had ended when the latter retired, while the former's charge up the order ultimately came to an end when he had to stop for fresh tyres. Denny Hulme was making steady progress behind Beltoise, while John Watson and Jean-Pierre Jarier were running close together at the tail end of the top ten.

Hunt suffered a suspension failure, sending him spinning onto the grass. Hailwood, meanwhile, caught and passed Depailler, although the Hunt's race was ruined by a spin a lap later which dumped him back down the order. Hailwood therefore joined the "battle" between Beltoise, Hulme and Jarier, while Depailler soldiered on for a few more laps before his Tyrrell picked up its customary brake problem, forcing him into the pits.

The two Lotus cars, meanwhile, were out of the fight, Peterson and Ickx taking turns to sit in the pits with a variety of issues being attended to, ranging from oil leaks to brake bleeding. Their miserable display was matched by Pace, whose race had come to an end with a vibration, while the sister car of Jochen Mass came to a stop with a suspension failure a few moments later. Jack Brabham's race was also turning into a disaster, with factory drivers Rikky von Opel and Reutemann out, leaving just local racer Teddy Pilette running at the back of the field, while debutante Tom Pryce in the Token had a premature end to the race when Scheckter crashed into his car.

Into the closing stages and it seemed as if the only driver really trying to make a difference was Hailwood, who had been on top form before his pirouette at the chicane. Hailwood was throwing his car around every corner to try and move back past teammate Hulme, and on lap 65 made an optimistic dive into turn one put him ahead. Four laps later and Hailwood pulled a double move on Beltoise and Jarier, at the hairpin, before sprinting off to try and hunt down the now wounded Scheckter.

Before any of that could be resolved, however, a wave of fuel feed problems shuffled the order behind the top two, with Regazzoni losing enough time to let a limping Scheckter through into third on the final lap. Ragazzonu was one of a number of victims of a lack of pickup by the fuel pump, which meant that the car would splutter around certain corners as the final few litres of fuel sloshed around the tank. Watson, Jarier, Vern Schuppan and Pryce (prior to his removal by Scheckter) were also victims of this issue, which vastly distorted the picture of the race.

That late twist did not affect that race winner, however, with Fittipaldi winning half a second clear of Lauda, before a large gap to Scheckter. Regazzoni remained in fourth, running out of fuel as he crossed the line, while Hailwood's run had been brought to an end on the penultimate lap by a similar issue. Hailwood therefore finished a lap down in seventh, behind Beltoise and Hulme, while the wave of late race casualties had promoted Graham Hill and the lowly Lola into eighth, a stunning result for a new car, albeit one that had been artificially created in the closing stages

Race classification

Championship standings after the race

Drivers' Championship standings

Constructors' Championship standings

Note: Only the top five positions are included for both sets of standings.

References

Belgian Grand Prix
Belgian Grand Prix
Grand Prix
Sport in Walloon Brabant
May 1974 sports events in Europe